The Elmira Civic Historic District is the area of downtown Elmira, New York where the governmental center developed in the town's early history.  It includes the Chemung County Courthouse Complex, John Hazlett Office Building and the Arnot Art Museum/Icehouse, all on Lake Street.  Among the contributing buildings on Church Street are the Richardson Romanesque style Armory Building, the Beaux Arts-style City Hall, designed by Pierce & Bickford, and the U. S. Post Office.  Other buildings are on nearby Baldwin Street, Market Street and Carroll Street. The district was added to the National Register of Historic Places in 1980; four decades later its boundaries were revised.

References

External links

Historic districts on the National Register of Historic Places in New York (state)
Georgian architecture in New York (state)
Historic districts in Chemung County, New York
National Register of Historic Places in Chemung County, New York